El Carmen is a municipality in the La Unión department of El Salvador.

Municipalities of the La Unión Department